Desani is a surname. Notable people with the surname include:

G. V. Desani (1909–2000), Indian writer and philosopher
Pietro Desani (1585–1647), Italian baroque period painter

See also
 Dasani